My Own Way EP is the third extended play (EP) by Evermore, which was released on 15 September 2003. Evermore made two music videos for tracks on the five-track EP, "Hold Off" and "My Own Way". Although it did not reache the top 100 of the ARIA Singles chart, it reached No. 11 on the related ARIA Hitseekers Singles chart. It was recorded with the line-up of Jon Hume on guitars and vocals; Dann Hume on drums and vocals and Peter Hume on bass guitar, keyboards and vocals. The three brothers wrote all the tracks. They supported its release with their third tour of Australia within two years.

Track listing

Personnel

Evermore
Jon Hume – vocals, guitar, bass guitar, producer, mixing engineer
Peter Hume – bass guitar, keyboards, vocals, artwork
Dann Hume – drums, percussion, guitar, vocals, artwork

Additional personnel
 Kalju Tonuma – mixing engineer
 Steve Smart – mastering engineer

Release history

References 

Evermore (band) albums
2003 EPs